The list of ship launches in 1730 includes a chronological list of some ships launched in 1730.


References

1730
Ship launches